Neckarsulm station is a railway station in the municipality of Neckarsulm, located in the Heilbronn district in Baden-Württemberg, Germany.

References

Railway stations in Baden-Württemberg
Buildings and structures in Heilbronn (district)
Railway stations in Germany opened in 1866